Lina Maria Hidalgo (born February 19, 1991) is an American politician in the state of Texas. She is the county judge of Harris County, the third-most populous county in the United States. Hidalgo is the first woman and the first Latina to be elected to this office. Notwithstanding the label, the position of county judge is for the most part a nonjudicial position in Texas. Hidalgo functions as the county's chief executive and its emergency manager. She oversees a budget of over $4 billion.

Early life and career
Hidalgo was born in Bogota, Colombia, on February 19, 1991. Her family left Colombia when she was five years old, and lived in Peru and Mexico City before moving to Houston, Texas, when she was 15.

Hidalgo graduated from Seven Lakes High School in Katy, Texas, and then attended Stanford University, graduating with a degree in political science in 2013. Her honors thesis was titled "Tiananmen or Tahrir? A Comparative Study of Military Intervention Against Popular Protest."

That same year, Hidalgo became a U.S. citizen. Upon graduation from Stanford, Hidalgo received the Omidyar Network Postgraduate Fellowship to work with an international organization. She moved to Thailand, where she worked for the Internews Network, an international nonprofit dedicated to training journalists and advocating for press freedom.

After returning to the U.S., Hidalgo worked as a medical interpreter at the Texas Medical Center in Houston and volunteered for the Texas Civil Rights Project. During this time, she was accepted into the MPP/JD joint program at the Harvard University Kennedy School of Government and New York University School of Law, respectively. Though Hidalgo originally planned to pursue a career in health care and criminal justice, the 2016 election inspired her to put her academic ambitions on hold and run for public office instead.

County Judge of Harris County

2018 election

Hidalgo ran for County Judge of Harris County in the 2018 elections. She was unopposed in the Democratic Party primary election and faced incumbent Ed Emmett in the general election. Hidalgo ran on a platform focused on flood control, criminal justice reform, and increasing transparency and accountability in local government. She defeated Emmett on November 6, becoming the first woman and Latina elected to the office of Harris County Judge. Her victory was considered an upset and attracted national attention, with a large and diverse coalition of activists and organizations leading her to a narrow 19,000-vote victory. The election also switched majority control of Harris County Commissioners Court, over which Hidalgo presides, from Republicans to Democrats.

Tenure 

Hidalgo championed misdemeanor cash bail reform in Harris County.

During the COVID-19 pandemic, Hidalgo implemented public health measures early in an attempt to halt the spread of the coronavirus. In March 2020, she ordered the closure of bars and restaurants. In April 2020, Hidalgo required Harris County members to wear face masks in public. Republicans at the state and federal level strongly criticized her public health measures. Governor Greg Abbott said that local officials could not enforce mask mandates. By June, as cases in Texas climbed, Abbott ordered his own face mask mandate.

Hidalgo appeared in video montages during the 2020 Democratic National Convention.

Hidalgo has been credited with making voting easier in Harris County during the 2020 Texas elections and with increasing turnout among lower-propensity voters. By October 30, 2020 (the Thursday before election day), more votes had been cast in Texas than the entire number cast in the 2016 United States presidential election in Texas.

Hidalgo has filed a lawsuit against the Texas Department of Transportation to stop the expansion of Interstate 45 through Houston. Because of her intervention, the federal government is investigating whether this proposed expansion, which could increase pollution and relocate people, violates any environmental and civil rights laws. The County later paused the lawsuit to negotiate with TxDOT.

Hidalgo's director of communications issued a statement noting that a third of Harris County residents are Spanish speakers: Judge Hidalgo represents all of Harris County and given the county's composition and her bilingual skills, she will continue to communicate as broadly as possible especially when public safety is at stake.

In December 2019, Hidalgo was named one of Forbes 30 under 30 in Law and Policy.

In March 2021, Harris County had a controversy over a contract awarded to Elevate Strategies, a company that was hired to do COVID-19 "vaccine outreach." The company had only one employee and was run out of an apartment in the city. Hidalgo and county commissioners allegedly had ties to Elevate Strategies. Mark Jones of Rice University said, "This was an RFP [request for proposal] that was wired from the very start to go to Elevate Strategies to provide political money for Lina Hidalgo's supporters". Hidalgo responded, "Y’all bring it on! Bring it on! Because there is nothing here." In the end,  the county terminated the $11 million contract.

2022 election 
Hidalgo defeated her opponent, Alexandra del Moral Mealer, by a margin of around 17,000 votes out of 1 million votes cast (50.8% to 49.2%).

Bilingual constituency relations 
Hidalgo was criticized after a March 2019 news conference in which she spoke in English and Spanish about the health implications of a massive chemical fire. She was addressing constituents and reporters from English- and Spanish-language media outlets. A Chambers County commissioner posted on social media: "English, this is not Mexico."

Recognition
Hidalgo was featured on the cover of Time in January 2018 alongside dozens of other women who ran for office in one of the biggest elections for women.

Electoral history
2018

See also
 Christopher G. Hollins - appointed county clerk under Hidalgo's government involved in the 2020 U.S. elections

References

Living people
People from Harris County, Texas
Texas Democrats
American politicians of Colombian descent
Stanford University alumni
Interpreters
New York University School of Law alumni
Harvard Kennedy School alumni
County judges in Texas
Women in Texas politics
Hispanic and Latino American women in politics
21st-century American women
1991 births